KRT75 is a keratin gene involved in hair shaft structure in mice. In chickens, mutations in KRT75 cause animals to have frizzled feathers.

References